Gharabaher is a Marathi political drama movie released on 27 October 1999. The movie was produced by Ratan Madaan and directed by Sanjay Surkar.

Plot
This is a political drama film a daughter takes over the chair of her MLA father. Soon she eventually realises that she has no power and is mere a puppet of evil politics.

Cast 
 Mohan Joshi
 Sonali Kulkarni
 Sachin Khedekar
 Smita Talwalkar
 Prashant Damle
 Rima

Awards and accolades
This movie won two National Awards (for Best Feature Film and Best Director) and eight Maharashtra State Awards (Best Feature Film, Best Director, Best Actor, Best Supporting Actor, Best Art Direction, Best Costumes, Best Make-up and Best Screenplay).

References

External links 
 
  Movie review - mouthshut.com
  Article - mid-day.com

1999 films
1990s Marathi-language films
Best Marathi Feature Film National Film Award winners
Films directed by Sanjay Surkar
Indian political drama films